The Grissom Gang is a 1971 American crime neo noir directed and produced by Robert Aldrich from a screenplay by Leon Griffiths. The film is the second adaptation of the 1939 novel No Orchids for Miss Blandish by James Hadley Chase; a previous version had been made in Britain in 1948. The cast includes Kim Darby, Scott Wilson, Tony Musante, Robert Lansing, Irene Dailey, Connie Stevens, Wesley Addy, Joey Faye and Ralph Waite.

Plot
In 1931, a Missourian meat heiress is robbed by three men, who panic after murdering her boyfriend and kidnap her. At their hideout, the three are ambushed and killed by Eddie Hagan, who happened to witness the crime, and the rest of the notorious Grissom Gang.

Barbara Blandish is held captive by the gang, including Slim Grissom, a mentally handicapped thug who falls in love with her. Ma Grissom, the gang's boss, sends a ransom note to the girl's father, John P. Blandish, demanding a million dollars for her return. But she has no intention of returning Barbara, and the plan to kill her meets the disapproval of Ma's husband Doc.

Private detective Dave Fenner is hired by Barbara's father as weeks go by. After at first insulting Slim as a "halfwit" and repelling his advances, Barbara realizes that the only thing keeping her alive is his desire for her, Slim vowing to kill any gang member who harms her. She reluctantly becomes Slim's lover.

Nightclub singer Anna Borg has no idea what became of her boyfriend, one of the kidnappers who got killed. She pulls a gun on Eddie, who lies that Anna's boyfriend ran off with another woman. Anna allows herself to be seduced by Eddie, who then murders two men with knowledge of the crime.

Months go by. Fenner, out of ideas, poses as a theatrical agent who can help Anna's singing career. He gets her talking about past criminal associations and learns where the missing girl might be. A furious Eddie kills Anna, then goes after Barbara only to have Slim stab him to death. Ma uses a machine gun to fight police and kills her husband Doc when he tries to surrender. Slim dies in a hail of bullets, but when Barbara weeps over him, her disgusted father walks away.

Cast 
 Kim Darby as Barbara Blandish
 Scott Wilson as Slim Grissom
 Tony Musante as Eddie Hagan
 Robert Lansing as Dave Fenner
 Irene Dailey as Gladys "Ma" Grissom
 Connie Stevens as Anna Borg
 Wesley Addy as John P. Blandish
 Don Keefer as Doc
 Joey Faye as Woppy
 Ralph Waite as Mace

Production
The film was based on the novel No Orchids for Miss Blandish which had been controversial ever since originally published. It had been turned into a controversial British film in 1948.

Gene D. Phillips of Loyola University of Chicago wrote that "It is a matter of record that [the novel] No Orchids for Miss Blandish was heavily indebted to Sanctuary for its plot line." Therefore, he considers this film to be inspired by Sanctuary.

The success of The Dirty Dozen led to Robert Aldrich signing a multi-picture contract with ABC Pictures. In May 1970 Martin Baum, president of ABC, announced Aldrich's company, Aldrich and Associates, would make The Grissom Gang, in June, at Aldrich's studios. Filming was pushed back to July.

Aldrich says he was partly inspired to make it by the fact it was set in the 1930 and would not be in as much danger of being dated. "You have to be terribly careful about not making a picture that will be affected by a change in the audience's framework of acceptance between the time you start and the time you finish", he said. "That's an enormous problem. Whatever you say today risks strongly going out of date in the fifteen month time-lag between the start of shooting and release."
 
Lead roles went to Kim Darby, best known for True Grit, and Scott Wilson, best known for In Cold Blood.

Darby said "every actress in town had been up for" her role, with Michelle Phillips and Barbara Hershey among those who tested. Darby says "I really learned a lot from Mr. Aldrich during the shooting... and I think that it's a terrible picture. But working with Aldrich was the most enjoyable and funny time I ever had. There was nothing like it."

Wilson had been offered a lot of roles as murderers after In Cold Blood and turned them down. He accepted the part of Slim Grissom because he "was much more than just a killer. And there's a love story involved." (Bruce Dern had tested unsuccessfully for the part.)

Aldrich later said ABC insisted on certain people being cast.

The cast had two weeks of rehearsal. Wilson called Aldrich "amazing. He's in such control but he's so easy."

"I don't think Mr. Aldrich ever even referenced the novel while we were shooting", said Darby. "At that time, I had thought that we were working off of an original screenplay."

The film originally ended with Blandish committing suicide by jumping in the river. But after test screenings this was changed as it was felt unnecessary since "her life was lost and useless anyway" according to Aldrich.

Difference from 1948 adaptation
Previously filmed in England in 1948 under its original title, the central conceit was that the heiress, who felt stifled by her upper-class life-style, fell in love with the abductor and his comparative freedom to live his life on the edge. In this remake, Aldrich and Griffiths reversed this angle: the heiress merely strings him along in an attempt to escape. This version was also played more for laughs, in particular the outlandishly deranged behavior of the gang. The time period and locale have also been changed from 1948 New York in the first adaptation to 1931 Missouri in the remake.

Release
"I think it's a good picture", said Aldrich shortly before the film came out. "It's a personal story; but, yes, it has quite a bit of violence. Grissom Gang may or may not make money. It's not a commercially-oriented picture. It won't make money for us because it's cross-collateralized back against our lawsuit with ABC." (The lawsuit he was referring to involved ABC cancelling a proposed Western Aldrich wanted to make called Rebellion.)

Critical reception
At the time of its release, reviewers criticized the melodramatic extremes of the script and the fact that the cast is shown sweating throughout the entire film. Vincent Canby of The New York Times wrote, "You don't really have to think very much about The Grissom Gang to call it offensive, immoral and perhaps even lascivious, although to me, that word, when it is applied to an aim, is more of a promise than a threat. The Grissom Gang, like so many Aldrich films, ... carries lurid melodrama and violence to outrageous limits, for what often seems like the purely perverse hell of it ... Everybody sweats constantly, and nobody dies off-screen, always on-screen, in what the newspapers of the day used to describe as a hail of bullets ... Aldrich lets his performers, especially Miss Dailey and Wilson, behave as if they were in The Beverly Hillbillies."

Roger Ebert of the Chicago Sun-Times was only slightly less harsh, saying, "We've been here before, most memorably with Bonnie and Clyde, but also with Roger Corman's seamy examination of the Barker family in Bloody Mama. Robert Aldrich's new film owes something to both. To Bonnie and Clyde for its convincing period feel, and to Bloody Mama for its treatment of a violent, sexually twisted family of criminals", adding "...the movie is deliberately melodramatic, and to such an overdone degree that (if you suspend your sanity for an hour or so) you can almost wallow in it. Everyone screams, shouts, flashes knives at each other and sweats a lot."

Variety also added, "Provided with a script that offers absolutely no insight into the inner lives of its people, director Robert Aldrich takes matters a step further by directing his actors in performances that strain the bounds of credulity. Wilson and Kim Darby, as the kidnapped girl, make stabs at more than one dimension, but when they indulge in caricatures of feeling, as they often do, they cancel out the rest of their work."

Modern critics hold the film in a slightly higher regard, with TimeOut saying "For one thing, the eponymous family, who kidnap '30s heiress Miss Blandish, are never glamorised but portrayed as a pathetic, ignorant bunch of grotesques; for another, as the petulant and spoilt heroine turns the sadistic and murderous Slim Grissom's love for her to her own cruelly humiliating purposes, the film becomes an unsentimental exploration of perverse power-games played between two characters whose very different family backgrounds cannot conceal the latent vulnerability they both share."

The film holds a 46% approval rating on Rotten Tomatoes based on thirteen reviews.

Box office
The film earned $340,000 in North American rentals and $250,000 in other countries. It recorded an overall loss of $3,670,000. It had admissions of 239,768 in France.

Aldrich later called it a "fine movie" and was confused why it did not do better commercially when so many movies set in the 1930s around this time were popular. "I think the timing was perfect, the style of picture was perfect. If you're asking me why that picture wasn't a success, I haven't a clue."

Home media
The Grissom Gang was released to Region 1 DVD via Anchor Bay Entertainment on October 21, 2000. A second DVD became available from MGM Home Entertainment on November 2, 2004.

On November 10, 2017, it was announced that The Grissom Gang would become available on Blu-ray via Kino Lorber in the United States and Canada. The set was expected to arrive in early 2018, however, its release date was moved and will be available from November 27, 2018. An additional DVD set will also be released.

Legacy 

In 2009 Empire Magazine named it #12 in a poll of the 20 Greatest Gangster Movies You've Never Seen* (*Probably)

See also
 List of American films of 1971

Notes

External links

1971 films
American crime drama films
1970s crime drama films
Films scored by Gerald Fried
Films about kidnapping
Films based on British novels
Films based on works by James Hadley Chase
Films directed by Robert Aldrich
Films set in the 1930s
American neo-noir films
Cinerama Releasing Corporation films
1971 drama films
1970s English-language films
1970s American films